Georges Hanna Sabbagh (1877–1951) was a French artist.

Biography
Georges Hanna Sabbagh was born at Alexandria. He studied art in Paris, being the first Egyptian at the Louvre School.  He was a pupil of Paul Sérusier, Félix Vallotton and the Symbolist painter Maurice Denis.  It can be said that he was attached to the artists of the Paris School - he worked beside Amedeo Modigliani - but he always refused to be considered one of them, keeping his independence and freedom. His family and the region of Brittany (where his children were born) provided him with subjects for many of his paintings, before trips to Egypt led him to rediscover the lights, landscapes and characters of his childhood. He excelled in portraits, nudes and landscapes both in France and in Egypt and was enchanted by the old districts of Cairo. A painter of talent, Georges Sabbagh forms one of the group of artists who Jean Cassou called "the sacrificed generation" (along with Henri de Waroquier and Jules-Émile Zingg) - absorbing the school of Les Nabis, Fauvism and Cubism at the beginning of the century, but forgotten after the Second World War.  Cassou describes him as a "cordial and deeply human painter".  He was able to create in the end of his career a new attitude towards realism.

He served in the British Army in the First World War.  In 1916 he married the art historian Agnès Humbert, by whom he had two children: the television producer and director Pierre Sabbagh, and the sub-mariner and advisor to General Charles de Gaulle, Jean Sabbagh. Georges and Agnès divorced in 1934.  After his death, his son Jean and daughter-in-law Monique were able to make a retrospective appreciation of his work and a catalogue.

Works
This is a partial list of the works of Georges Hanna Sabbagh

 Fernand Mazade, 1918, Mathaf: Arab Museum of Modern Art, Doha
 Allégorie de la paix, 1918, Musée de la Princerie, Verdun (Meuse)
 Synthèse de Ploumanac'h, 1920, Musée départemental de l'Oise, Beauvais
 La chapelle de la Clarté, 1920, Musée des Années Trente, Boulogne-Billancourt
 Les Sabbagh à la Clarté, 1920, Musée National d'Art Moderne, Paris
 La robe bleue, 1920, Musée départemental Maurice Denis "The Priory", Saint-Germain-en-Laye

 Maternités arabes, 1920-1921, Mathaf: Arab Museum of Modern Art, Doha
 Les Sabbagh à Paris, 1921, Museum of Grenoble
 Le nu à la fourrure, 1921, Musée des Années Trente
 Portrait of Johannes Tielrooy, 1921, Nederlands Letterkundig Museum, The Hague
 Vénus Anadyomène, 1922, Musée des Années Trente
 L'Été, 1922, Musée des Années Trente
 Le jugement de Pâris, 1923, Musée de Rio de Janeiro
 La Creuse de Crozant, 1925, Mairie de Crozant
 Assouan, 1930, Gezira Center for Modern Art, Cairo
 Le couvent copte de Saint-Siméon, 1930
 Marine, 1931, Musée des Beaux-Arts André Malraux, Le Havre

Bibliography
Jean Sabbagh and Pierre Sabbagh, Georges Sabbagh, Paris, J. Sabbagh, 1981  
Jean Sabbagh with Monique Sabbagh, Mathide Sabbagh and Marc Sabbagh, Georges Sabbagh, Peintures-Aquarelles-Dessins (Paintings-Watercolours-Drawings), preface by Monique Sabbagh and Emmanuel Bréon, Paris, Editions du Panama

References

Humbert, Agnès (tr. Barbara Mellor), Résistance: Memoirs of Occupied France, London, Bloomsbury Publishing PLC, 2008

External links
  Georges Sabbagh
 Mathaf: biography

1877 births
1951 deaths
20th-century French painters
20th-century French male artists
French male painters
French male artists
20th-century French artists
Egyptian emigrants to France